Maximiliano Joaquín Silvera Cabo (born 5 September 1997) is a Uruguayan professional footballer who plays as a forward for Liga MX club Necaxa, on loan from Uruguayan Primera División club Cerrito.

Career
Silvera is a former youth academy player of Danubio. He left the club as he wasn't getting paid for his travel expenses. He joined Cerrito later and made his senior team debut on 21 March 2015 in a 4–2 league defeat against Villa Española.

Silvera was instrumental in Cerrito's promotion to the Uruguayan Primera División after the conclusion of 2020 Uruguayan Segunda División season. With 11 goals, he was league top scorer and was chosen as the best player.

Career statistics

Club

Honours
Cerrito
 Uruguayan Segunda División: 2020
 Uruguayan Segunda División Amateur: 2015–16

Individual
 Uruguayan Primera División Team of the Year: 2021
 Uruguayan Primera División top scorer: 2021
 Uruguayan Segunda División top scorer: 2020

References

External links
 

1997 births
Living people
People from Pando, Uruguay
Association football forwards
Uruguayan footballers
Uruguayan Primera División players
Uruguayan Segunda División players
Liga MX players
Sportivo Cerrito players
FC Juárez footballers
Uruguayan expatriate footballers
Uruguayan expatriate sportspeople in Mexico
Expatriate footballers in Mexico